The Chicago White Sox are a Major League Baseball (MLB) franchise based in Chicago, Illinois. They play in the American League Central division. Since the institution of MLB's Rule 4 Draft, the White Sox have selected 66 players in the first round. Officially known as the "First-Year Player Draft", the Rule 4 Draft is MLB's primary mechanism for assigning amateur baseball players from high schools, colleges, and other amateur baseball clubs to its teams. The draft order is determined based on the previous season's standings, with the team possessing the worst record receiving the first pick. In addition, teams which lost free agents in the previous off-season may be awarded compensatory or supplementary picks.

Of the 66 players picked in the first round by the Chicago White Sox, 32 have been pitchers, the most of any position; 20 of them were right-handed, while 12 were left-handed. Twelve outfielders, eight catchers, five shortstops, five third basemen, and four first basemen were also taken. The team has never drafted a player at second base. Fourteen of the players came from high schools or universities in the state of California, and Florida follows with eight players. The White Sox have also drafted six players from their home state of Illinois.

One player has won a championship with the team; Aaron Rowand (1998) was part of the 2005 World Series championship team. Thomas was a member of the White Sox for 16 years, including the 2005 season, but was not part of the World Series roster due to injury. Thomas is also the only first-round draft pick to win the Most Valuable Player Award, winning the American League honors in both 1993 and 1994. One pick, 1987 selection Jack McDowell, has won the Cy Young Award with the team; he won it in 1993. The White Sox had the first overall selection twice in the draft, which they used on Danny Goodwin (1971) and Harold Baines (1977).

The White Sox have made 16 selections in the supplemental round of the draft and 5 compensatory picks since the institution of the First-Year Player Draft in 1965. These additional picks are provided when a team loses a particularly valuable free agent in the previous off-season, or, more recently, if a team fails to sign a draft pick from the previous year. The White Sox have failed to sign three of their first-round picks: Danny Goodwin (1971), Steve Buechele (1979), and Bobby Seay (1996). The White Sox did not receive any compensation for Goodwin or Buechele, but they did receive the 51st pick in 1997 for failing to sign Seay.

Key

Picks

See also
Chicago White Sox minor league players

Footnotes
 Through the 2012 draft, free agents were evaluated by the Elias Sports Bureau and rated "Type A", "Type B", or not compensation-eligible. If a team offered arbitration to a player but that player refused and subsequently signed with another team, the original team was able to receive additional draft picks. If a "Type A" free agent left in this way, his previous team received a supplemental pick and a compensatory pick from the team with which he signed. If a "Type B" free agent left in this way, his previous team received only a supplemental pick. Since the 2013 draft, free agents are no longer classified by type; instead, compensatory picks are only awarded if the team offered its free agent a contract worth at least the average of the 125 current richest MLB contracts. However, if the free agent's last team acquired the player in a trade during the last year of his contract, it is ineligible to receive compensatory picks for that player.
 The White Sox lost their first-round pick in 1978 to the New York Yankees as compensation for signing free agent Ron Blomberg.
 The White Sox gained a compensatory first-round pick in 1979 from the Baltimore Orioles for losing free agent Steve Stone.
 The White Sox gained a compensatory first-round pick in 1983 from the New York Yankees for losing free agent Steve Kemp.
 The White Sox gained a supplemental first-round pick in 1983 for losing free agent Steve Kemp.
 The White Sox gained a compensatory first-round pick in 1984 from the Toronto Blue Jays for losing free agent Dennis Lamp.
 The White Sox gained a supplemental first-round pick in 1994 for losing free agent Ellis Burks.
 The White Sox gained a supplemental first-round pick in 1997 for losing free agent Alex Fernandez.
 The White Sox gained a supplemental first-round pick in 1997 for losing free agent Kevin Tapani.
 The White Sox gained a supplemental first-round pick in 1997 for losing free agent Alex Fernandez.
 The White Sox gained a supplemental first-round pick in 1997 for losing free agent Alex Fernandez.
 The White Sox gained a supplemental first-round pick in 1997 for failing to sign draft pick Bobby Seay.
 The White Sox gained a supplemental first-round pick in 1998 for losing free agent Dave Martinez.
 The White Sox gained a compensatory first-round pick in 1999 from the New York Mets for losing free agent Robin Ventura.
 The White Sox gained a supplemental first-round pick in 1999 for losing free agent Albert Belle.
 The White Sox gained a supplemental first-round pick in 1999 for losing free agent Robin Ventura.
 The White Sox gained a compensatory first-round pick in 2001 from the Florida Marlins for losing free agent Charles Johnson.
 The White Sox gained a supplemental first-round pick in 2001 for losing free agent Charles Johnson.
 The White Sox gained a supplemental first-round pick in 2004 for losing free agent Bartolo Colón.
 The White Sox gained a supplemental first-round pick in 2004 for losing free agent Tom Gordon.
 The White Sox gained a supplemental first-round pick in 2009 for losing free agent Orlando Cabrera.
 The White Sox gained a supplemental first-round pick in 2011 for losing free agent J. J. Putz.
 The White Sox gained a supplemental first-round pick in 2012 for losing free agent Mark Buehrle.

References
General references

In-text citations

First-round
Chicago White Sox